The West Coast Sound (subtitled Volume 1) is an album by drummer Shelly Manne's group Shelly Manne & His Men, recorded at sessions in 1953 and 1955 and released on the Contemporary label. The album features Manne's first recordings for Contemporary from 1953—eight tracks originally released on a 10-inch album—along with an additional four tracks from 1955.

Reception

The AllMusic review by Scott Yanow states: "the music has plenty of variety yet defines the era... Highly recommended and proof (if any is really needed) that West Coast jazz was far from bloodless".

Track listing
 "Grasshopper" (Shelly Manne) - 2:52
 "La Mucura" (Traditional) - 3:02 		
 "Summer Night" (Harry Warren, Al Dubin) - 3:19 		
 "Afrodesia" (Shorty Rogers) - 3:30
 "You and the Night and the Music" (Arthur Schwartz, Howard Dietz) - 3:10
 "Gazelle" (Bill Russo) - 3:01
 "Sweets" (Russo) - 2:53
 "Spring Is Here" (Richard Rodgers, Lorenz Hart) - 2:43
 "Mallets" (Shorty Rogers) - 3:26 		
 "You're Getting to Be a Habit with Me" (Warren, Dubin) - 3:14
 "You're My Thrill" (Burton Lane, Ned Washington) - 3:05 
 "Fugue" (Jimmy Giuffre) - 2:47    	  
Recorded at Contemporary's studio in Los Angeles on April 6, 1953 (tracks 2, 5, 6 & 9), July 20, 1953 (tracks 4, 7, 11 &  12), and September 13, 1955 (tracks 1, 3, 8 & 10).

Personnel
Shelly Manne & His Men
Shelly Manne - drums
Bob Enevoldsen - valve trombone
Joe Maini (tracks 1, 3, 8 & 10), Art Pepper (tracks 2, 5, 6 & 9), Bud Shank (tracks 4, 7, 11 & 12) - alto saxophone
Bob Cooper (tracks 2, 4-7, 9, 11 & 12), Bill Holman (tracks 1, 3, 8 & 10) - tenor saxophone
Jimmy Giuffre - baritone saxophone
Russ Freeman (tracks 1, 3, 8 & 10), Marty Paich (tracks 2, 4-7, 9, 11 & 12) - piano
Curtis Counce (tracks 2, 5, 6 & 9), Joe Mondragon  (tracks 4, 7, 11 &  12), Ralph Peña (tracks 1, 3, 8 & 10) - bass
Arrangements by Bob Enevoldsen (track 10), Jimmy Giuffre (track 12), Bill Holman (tracks 1 & 8), Marty Paich (tracks 3 & 11), Shorty Rogers (tracks 2, 4 & 9) and Bill Russo (tracks 5-7)

References

1956 albums
Contemporary Records albums
Shelly Manne albums
Albums arranged by Marty Paich
Albums arranged by Bill Russo
Albums arranged by Shorty Rogers